Rollag is a municipality in the traditional and electoral district Buskerud in Viken county, Norway.  It is part of the traditional region of Numedal.  The administrative centre of the municipality is the village of Rollag, although the most populated area in the municipality is Veggli.  Rollag is bordered in the north by Nore og Uvdal, in the east by Sigdal, in the south by Flesberg, and in the west by Tinn in Telemark.

General information

History
The municipality (originally the parish) is named after the old Rollag farm (Old Norse: Roll(u)lag), since the first church was built here. The first element is probably (the genitive case of) a river name Rolla (now called the Troelva river) and the last element is lag which means "fishing place".

The municipality of Rollag was established on 1 January 1838 (see formannskapsdistrikt). Nore og Uvdal was separated from Rollag in 1858. 
The coat-of-arms is from modern times.  They were granted in 1993.  The arms show two gold-colored lines on a red background.  The lines represent an old warning cairn made of timber.

Geography
The municipality lies in the heart of the Numedal traditional region and valley, the westernmost valley in southeastern Norway. The river Numedalslågen flows through Rollag and into the Ytre Oslofjord at Larvik.  In the northwest of the Rollag lie the Vegglifjell mountains, which are an entryway into the Hardangervidda. The municipality's highest point is Storegrønut at  located in the Vegglifjell mountains.

Rollag stave church
Rollag stave church (Rollag stavkirke) was built around 1150–1200. It is located a few kilometres north of the centre of Rollag. It was extended and windows were added in 1652. A new Apse was added in 1666. The transept was constructed in 1697–1698. A gallery was added in 1702. The sacristy was built in 1739. A Baroque pulpit was added in 1763.

Sister cities
The following cities are twinned with Rollag:
  Jokioinen, Southern Finland, Finland

Notable people 

 Niels Andreas Vibe (1759 in Rollag – 1814) a Norwegian military officer, civil and royal servant
 Ole Knudsen Nattestad (1807 in Veggli – 1886) a Norwegian-American pioneer immigrant settler
 Christian Sparre (1859–1940) a Commanding Admiral and politician; brought up in Rollag
 Herbrand Lofthus (1889 in Veggli 1972) a lightweight Greco-Roman wrestler, competed at the 1912 Summer Olympics
 Kittill Kristoffersen Berg (1903 in Rollag – 1983) a labourer, log driver, farmer and politician
 Halvor Kongsjorden (1911 in Veggli – 1990) a sport shooter, Olympic competitor in 1948 and a Norwegian resistance member
 Ragnar Tveiten (born 1938 in Veggli) a former Norwegian biathlete

References

External links

Municipal fact sheet from Statistics Norway

Culture in Rollag on the map from Kulturnett.no
Another map of Rollag

 
Municipalities of Buskerud
Municipalities of Viken (county)
Villages in Buskerud
Populated places on the Numedalslågen